The Long Way Home is the debut studio album by British hip hop duo Krept and Konan. Originally scheduled for release on 6 July 2015, the album was released a day early on 5 July 2015 by Play Dirty, Virgin EMI and Def Jam. The album features guest appearances from British singers Emeli Sandé, Rebecca Garton and Ed Sheeran, American singer Jeremih, American rappers Rick Ross, YG and Wiz Khalifa, British rapper Skepta and Derrick Morgan. The title, artwork and release date was published on 23 March 2015 via Twitter.

The lead single "Freak of the Week" featuring Jeremih became a top ten hit and also became Krept and Konan's first top 40 entry. The Long Way Home received positive reviews from critics and entered the UK Albums Chart at number 2 while topping the UK R&B Chart.

Singles 
"Certified" featuring American rapper Rick Ross was released as a promotional single on 27 March 2015, along with a lyrics video.

The first official single "Freak of the Week" featuring Jeremih was released on 28 June 2015 and entered the UK Singles Chart at number 9, becoming Krept and Konan's first top 40 entry and highest-charting single, as well as becoming Jeremih's second highest-charting single in the UK after "Don't Tell 'Em" featuring YG.

Chart performance 
The Long Way Home debuted at number 2 on the UK Albums Chart on 10 July 2015, beaten only by Ed Sheeran's x. The album entered at number 1 on the UK R&B Chart and UK Digital Chart. The Long Way Home is Krept and Konan's highest-charting project, surpassing the performance of the mixtape Young Kingz (2013) which peaked at number 19.

Track listing

Charts

Certifications

Release history

References

2015 debut albums
Krept and Konan albums
Albums produced by DJ Mustard